Conus granulatus is a species of sea snail, a marine gastropod mollusk in the family Conidae, the cone snails and their allies.

Like all species within the genus Conus, these snails are predatory and venomous. They are capable of "stinging" humans, therefore live ones should be handled carefully or not at all.

Distribution
This species occurs in the Western Atlantic, at depths to 50 metres, and in the Caribbean Sea and in the Gulf of Mexico.

Description 
The maximum recorded shell length is 64.1 mm. Shell fragments are known that would suggest a maximum size around 77 mm.

The shell is regularly grooved throughout the body whorl, with the interstices plane or granular. The spire is striate, often gradate. The color is orange-red, raised portions with very narrow chestnut revolving lines, white clouded, especially in the middle, forming an irregular band, which is mottled and bordered with chestnut. The interior of the aperture is rosy.

Habitat 
Minimum recorded depth is 0 m. Maximum recorded depth is 30 m.  At Barbados, the species seems to prefer offshore banking reefs where the water is clean, clear and well oxygenated although in past times it appears to have inhabited much shallower waters close to shore, before environmental degradation.

Gallery

References

 Filmer R.M. (2001). A Catalogue of Nomenclature and Taxonomy in the Living Conidae 1758 - 1998. Backhuys Publishers, Leiden. 388pp.

External links
 The Conus Biodiversity website
Cone Shells - Knights of the Sea
 Linnaeus, C. (1758). Systema Naturae per regna tria naturae, secundum classes, ordines, genera, species, cum characteribus, differentiis, synonymis, locis. Editio decima, reformata. Laurentius Salvius: Holmiae. ii, 824 pp 
 Puillandre N., Duda T.F., Meyer C., Olivera B.M. & Bouchet P. (2015). One, four or 100 genera? A new classification of the cone snails. Journal of Molluscan Studies. 81: 1–23
 Rosenberg, G.; Moretzsohn, F.; García, E. F. (2009). Gastropoda (Mollusca) of the Gulf of Mexico, pp. 579–699 in: Felder, D.L. and D.K. Camp (eds.), Gulf of Mexico–Origins, Waters, and Biota. Texas A&M Press, College Station, Texas

granulatus
Gastropods described in 1758
Taxa named by Carl Linnaeus